Batheay is a district (srok) of Kampong Cham province, Cambodia. The district capital is Ph'av town. The town is located on National Highway 6 around 64 kilometres east of the provincial capital at Kampong Cham city and 60 kilometres north of the Cambodian capital Phnom Penh. The district lies at the junction between two major waterways, the Mekong River and the Tonle Sap.

In August 2006, Batheay district was the site of an outbreak of the deadly H5N1 virus commonly known as "avian influenza" or "bird flu". The outbreak was detected in live and dead ducks taken from a farm in the district and the Ministry of Agriculture culled 700 birds to prevent further outbreaks. Authorities suspect that ducks smuggled from Prey Veng Province where an earlier outbreak was confirmed, to nearby Tbong Khmum district, were responsible for this the new outbreak. Overall, more than 3000 ducks were slaughtered in Kampong Cham to prevent further infections. No human infections were reported.

Location 
Batheay district is the easternmost district of Kampong Cham Province and borders on two other provinces. Reading from the north clockwise, Batheay shares a border with Kampong Thom province to the north and the districts of Cheung Prey and Kang Meas to the east. To the south of Batheay are Ksach Kandal, Mukh Kampuol and Ponhea Leu districts of Kandal province. Batheay shares its western border with Kampong Tralach and Chol Kiri districts of Kampong Chhnang province.

Administration 
Mr. Yin Kim Horn is the Batheay district governor and reports to Hun Neng the Governor of Kampong Cham. The following table shows the villages of Batheay district by commune.

Demographics 
The district is subdivided into 12 communes (khum) and 80 villages (phum). According to the 1998 Census, the population of the district was 90,920 persons in 17,541 households in 1998. With a population of over 90,000 people, Batheay is one of the less populous districts in Kampong Cham province. The average household size in Batheay is 5.1 persons per household, the same as the rural average for Cambodia. The sex ratio in the district is 91.3%, with more females than males.

References

External links
Kampong Cham at Royal Government of Cambodia website
Kampong Cham at Ministry of Commerce website

Districts of Kampong Cham province